Papakura Military Camp is a New Zealand Army military camp located in the Auckland suburb of Papakura North, in northern New Zealand. It is the home of the New Zealand Special Air Service.

Geography
The camp was established on the outskirts of the Papakura Town Centre in 1939 and built by the Stevenson family. and remains an important army base for New Zealand. It incorporates the New Zealand SAS training area and a local suburban area of army homes for personnel on Arimu Road and Russell Avenue in the same vicinity. Until recently, the majority of the homes have now been sold for private use, but the area still remains restricted as a Defence Area. In the early 2000s some land surrounding the camp was set aside for new housing developments by the Papakura District Council.

See also
Burnham, New Zealand
Linton Military Camp
Papakura District
Trentham Military Camp
Waiouru Military Camp

References

Further reading 

Installations of the New Zealand Army
Buildings and structures in the Auckland Region